Frederick Riley (9 January 1912 – 7 December 1942) was an English footballer who represented Great Britain at the 1936 Summer Olympics. Riley played amateur football for Casuals. He was killed when his plane was shot down over France during World War II.

Personal life
Riley enlisted in the Royal Air Force in February 1939, and was transferred to active service soon after the start of the Second World War. As part of No. 263 Squadron, he took part in the Battle of Britain flying Supermarine Spitfires. On 7 December 1942, Riley, by then a Flight Lieutenant, was shot down and killed during a reconnaissance mission over France. He was buried at Boulogne Eastern Cemetery.

References

External links

1912 births
1942 deaths
English footballers
Casuals F.C. players
Footballers at the 1936 Summer Olympics
Olympic footballers of Great Britain
Association football forwards
Royal Air Force personnel killed in World War II
British World War II fighter pilots
Military personnel from Manchester
Royal Air Force pilots of World War II
Royal Air Force officers
Aviators killed by being shot down